Diego Hartfield (born 31 January 1981), nicknamed 'El Gato Hartfield' (Hartfield the Cat in Spanish) is a stockbroker and a former tennis player on the ATP Tour from Argentina.

Career

2000 : Diego began his pro career by playing Futures in South America.

2001 : He reached his first career Futures final in Mendoza (Argentina), was three times Doubles finalist at Futures, and won one title in Asunción (Paraguay)

2002 : He won his first career Futures Singles title in Viña del Mar (Chile) and reached the final in Santa Cruz (Bolivia). He won two Doubles titles in Bolivia at the Cochabamba and Santa Cruz Futures and reached the final in La Paz (Bolivia).

2003 : Diego won the Futures title in Viña del Mar, for the second time. He reached the Singles finals in Uruguay and Buenos Aires. He won a Futures doubles title in Santiago de Chile and reached three finals in Argentina, Uruguay and Slovenia.

2004 : He won a Futures title at Santiago de Chile and three Futures doubles titles in San Salvador, Netherlands (Alkmaar) and France (Blois).

2005 : He reached his first career Challenger Singles final in Buenos Aires and in Doubles in Nashville (USA). He won a Futures title in Córdoba (Argentina), reached the Futures Singles final in Colombia, but won the title in Doubles.

2006 : He won three Challenger titles in Atlanta (USA), Tunica Resorts (USA), Bogotá (Colombia) and entered the Top 125 for the first time. 
He played his first Gran Slam in Roland Garros as a qualifier and entered the main draw, but lost vs. world No. 1 Roger Federer after a hard battle.

2007 : He reached the final of the São Paulo Challenger and advanced to his first ATP SF in his hometown of Buenos Aires. He reached the semis at the Prague and San Marino Challengers. He was Doubles finalist at the Challenger in Andrézieux (France) and Singles finalist in Bogotá (Colombia).
In Roland Garros, he defeated Ginepri in five sets in the first round before losing to Ferrer in the second round. For the first time, he reached a QF indoor in Lyon (France).
Always improving his ranking, he finished in the Top 100 for the first time.

2008 : He reached the Singles Challenger final in Milano (Italy) and Scheveningen (the Netherlands) and the Doubles final at the Bordeaux Challenger (France).

2009 : During a practice at the Copa Petrobras Challenger in Buenos Aires, Diego twisted his knee and tore its ligaments. The same accident happened to his other knee at the Copa Telmex in Buenos Aires. After two surgeries that took him away from the courts until September, he made a short comeback at Futures in Adrogué (Argentina). He's training hard to be back on tour during Spring 2010.

2010: Hartfield announces his retirement from professional tennis.

ATP Challenger and ITF Futures finals

Singles: 16 (7–9)

Doubles: 19 (10–9)

Performance timeline

Singles

External links
 
 

1981 births
Living people
People from Oberá
Argentine people of British descent
Argentine male tennis players
Tennis players from Buenos Aires